James Jim Shamberger (born October 15, 1918) is an American former Negro league third baseman who played between 1938 and 1940.

A native of Lower Peach Tree, Alabama, Shamberger made his Negro leagues debut in 1938 with the Atlanta Black Crackers. He went on to play for the Indianapolis Crawfords in 1940.

References

External links
 and Seamheads

1918 births
Atlanta Black Crackers players
Baseball third basemen
Baseball players from Alabama
People from Wilcox County, Alabama
Possibly living people